Ghagra Union is a place situated at the North-West side of Purbadhala Upazila in Bangladesh. It stands on the bank of the Kongsho river. The Dhobaura Upazila of Mymensingh District is situated at the North and West side of the Ghagra Union.

Netrokona District